The men's shot put at the 2018 European Athletics Championships took place at the Olympic Stadium on 6 and 7 August. The qualifications took place at a temporary venue at Breitscheidplatz.

Records

Schedule

Results

Qualification

Qualification: 20.40 m (Q) or best 12 performers (q)

Final

References

Shot Put
Shot put at the European Athletics Championships